Sasahara (written:  lit. "bamboo field") is a Japanese surname. Notable people with the surname include:

, Japanese judoka
, Japanese Paralympic athlete
, Japanese anime director
, Japanese sport wrestler
, Japanese footballer
, Japanese racing driver
, Japanese footballer
, Japanese voice actress
, Japanese skeleton racer

Fictional characters
, protagonist of the manga series Genshiken

Japanese-language surnames